Iman Griffith (born 2 December 2001) is a Dutch professional footballer who plays as a winger for Dutch club Jong AZ.

Club career
Griffith made his professional debut with Jong AZ in a 3–2 Eerste Divisie loss to FC Volendam on 25 October 2019.

Personal life
Born in the Netherlands, Griffith is of Surinamese descent.

References

External links
 
 Career stats & Profile - Voetbal International

2001 births
Living people
Dutch footballers
Dutch sportspeople of Surinamese descent
Association football wingers
Jong AZ players
Eerste Divisie players